Eli Alaluf (born 17 February 1945) is an Israeli politician. Formerly a senior bureaucrat for the Israeli government and Israeli NGOs, who later served as a member of the Knesset for Kulanu.

Biography
Alaluf was born in Fes, Morocco. In 1967, he immigrated to Israel. He studied political science at the Hebrew University of Jerusalem from 1968 to 1972. From his time at university until 1978, he was the director of the French-speaking youth unit of the World Zionist Organization. At the same time he joined the army and served in the artillery.

From 1978 to 1981, Alaluf served as an assistant in Minister Yigael Yadin's office, working with Project Renewal. He then worked for the Jewish Agency in renewal and development. In 1989, he was elected to the Beersheba city council and served until 1992.

Alaluf was a shaliach for Keren Hayesod in Switzerland between 1992 and 1995. Upon his return to Israel, he was appointed director general of the Rashi Foundation, where he served until 2012. In 2013, he was appointed to head the Alaluf Committee to Fight Poverty. While on the committee Alaluf received a 4.8 million NIS retirement package from the Rashi Foundation.

Political career
In December 2014 Alaluf joined the new Kulanu party headed by Moshe Kahlon, and was originally placed sixth on the list for the 2015 elections.  After Tsega Melaku's disqualification, he moved to the third slot. He lost his seat in the April 2019 elections.

Awards
In 2011, Alaluf was awarded the Israel Prize for lifetime achievement and special contribution to society in recognition of his work with the Rashi Foundation.

Alaluf holds honorary doctorates from Ben-Gurion University and the Technion.

References

External links

Living people
1945 births
Hebrew University of Jerusalem Faculty of Social Sciences alumni
People from Fez, Morocco
20th-century Moroccan Jews
Moroccan emigrants to Israel
Israeli Jews
Israel Prize for lifetime achievement & special contribution to society recipients
Kulanu politicians
Members of the 20th Knesset (2015–2019)